The Sons of Divine Providence, commonly called the Orionine Fathers, is a Roman Catholic clerical religious congregation of Pontifical Right for men founded in 1903 by Luigi Orione (1872–1940) in  Turin, Italy. Its members add the nominal letters F.D.P. after their names to indicate membership in the congregation. It is dedicated to helping the poor and is currently active in 23 nations.

History

The Sons of Divine Providence is a Catholic religious institute founded in Italy in 1893 by Luigi Orione. Orione began his work with orphans and street children in the city of Tortona in north-west Italy while he was still a student. On October 15, 1895, Orione opened his first boarding school, titled the Little House of Divine Providence. A man of enormous energy, by the time of his death in 1940 Don Orione and his followers had established services for the care of elderly, disabled and disadvantaged people all over Italy, as well as in Poland, Brazil, Argentina and Palestine.

In 1913 began the activities of the missions outside Italy with the departure of a priest and two brothers to Brazil, immediately followed by other expeditions to Argentina and the Holy Land. Orione himself served as a missionary in Latin America (Brazil, Argentina, Uruguay and Chile) in the years 1921-22 and 1934–37. In the 1920s and 1930s, while continuing assistance to youth with orphanages, agricultural schools and education institutions, the institute deepened the commitment to pastoral care to other categories of the needy; developed health care activity for people with severe mental and physical disabilities, and nursing homes for the elderly and lonely people.

Description
The English Delegation "Mother of the Church", run presently by Father Malcolm George Dyer are present in Philippine, India, Jordan, Kenya, United Kingdom, Ireland, and in USA.
The first foundation of the Little Work of Divine Providence in the United States was a home for elderly Italian immigrants in Boston. 
The Sons of Divine Providence came to England in 1949 when Fr. Paul Bidone arrived from Italy. He spoke no English and carried only a ten shilling note and the name of one British contact. However, three years later he had opened the first home, Fatima House in south London, for homeless elderly men.
 Don Orione missionaries have been present in Kenya since the arrival in 1996 of the first Italian priest Fr Giuseppe Vallauri, who had been resident in England for many years. Fr Vallauri settled in Langata South Road in the outskirts of Nairobi purchasing a house which later became the first seminary.

Saint Luigi Orione's motto, and that of the FDP, is: "Fare del bene a tutti, fare del bene sempre, del male mai a nessuno. ("Do good to all, do good always, never do harm to anyone.")

As of 2016, the Sons of Divine Providence number 1023: three bishops, 728 priests, 82 brothers, and eight hermits. In formation there are 201 clerics and 19 brothers of temporary vows, and 45 novices. The FDP have centers in 296 localities in 32 nations.

In the United States, the headquarters of the congregation is at the National Shrine of the Madonna, located on a historic hill in East Boston, Massachusetts, known as Orient Heights.

References

External links
 Sons of Divine Providence